The first Wearmouth Bridge was the second major bridge to be made from cast iron. It was considered one of the wonders of the industrial age, and was described by Nikolaus Pevsner as being 'a triumph of the new metallurgy and engineering ingenuity [...] of superb elegance'.

Design

The bridge was instigated, sponsored and patented by Rowland Burdon, the Member of Parliament for County Durham, and built under the direction of Thomas Wilson, who designed its architectural features.

Indeed, at the time of building, it was the biggest single-span bridge in the world (72 m), matching the collapsed Trezzo Bridge.

The decision to use cast iron was strongly influenced by Thomas Paine, who had constructed a demonstration cast iron span of comparable length in Paddington in 1789, and had submitted models and designs for Wearmouth.

Construction

The foundation stone was laid in September 1793.

It is possible that two of the six main ribs used in the Wearmouth bridge, were created from the actual ribs used by Paine in his prototype, which had been returned to the Foundry in Rotherham where the ribs of both bridges were cast.

The bridge was opened in 1796.

Impact
According to the plaque on the current bridge, its construction "proved to be a catalyst for the growth of Sunderland," since access between Monkwearmouth and Bishopwearmouth had previously only been by ferry, with the nearest bridge at Chester-le-Street.

Operation
It opened to traffic on 9 August 1796, having cost a total of about £28,000.

There was originally a toll for traffic and pedestrians, although tolls for pedestrians were abolished in 1846.

1805 repair
In 1805 the bridge had to be repaired after heat from the sun caused some of the cross tubes to fall out.

1857 reconstruction

From 1857 to 1859 it was reconstructed by Robert Stephenson, who stripped the bridge back to its six iron ribs and levelled the roadway by raising the abutments. The bridge was reopened in March 1859, with the toll completely abolished in 1885.

Further reading

References

Cast-iron arch bridges in England
Bridges across the River Wear
Bridges completed in 1796
1796 establishments in Great Britain